Budapesti Korcsolyázó Egylet (commonly abbreviated BKE) is a Budapest based ice skating sports association. Founded in 1869, it is one of the oldest of its kind in Hungary. They actively participate in competitive ice skating disciplines, such as figure skating, speed skating, and short track speed skating.

BKE also had an ice hockey team, which played their first official game in 1906, and won the Hungarian Championship title seven times.

Ice hockey team
Hungarian Championship:
Winners: 1937, 1938, 1939, 1940, 1942, 1944, 1946

Notable players
 György Pásztor

Famous skaters
The following are ice skaters of the Budapesti Korcsolyázó Egylet, who participated at Winter Olympic Games, and/or won medals at the European Championships or World Championships.

Figure skating

Singles
 Tibor von Földváry
 Lily Kronberger
 Opika von Méray Horváth
 Andor Szende
 Elemér Terták
 Ede Király
 György Czakó
 Krisztina Czakó

Pairs
 Olga Orgonista – Sándor Szalay
 Emilia Rotter – László Szollás
 Lucy Galló – Rezső Dillinger
 Piroska Szekrényesy – Attila Szekrényesy
 Andrea Kékessy – Ede Király
 Marianna Nagy – László Nagy

Speed skating
 Kornél Pajor

References

External links

Ice hockey teams in Hungary
Sport in Budapest
Sports clubs established in 1869
1869 establishments in Austria-Hungary